In mathematics, a stopped process is a stochastic process that is forced to assume the same value after a prescribed (possibly random) time.

Definition
Let
  be a probability space; 
  be a measurable space;
  be a stochastic process;

Examples

Gambling

Consider a gambler playing roulette. Xt denotes the gambler's total holdings in the casino at time t ≥ 0, which may or may not be allowed to be negative, depending on whether or not the casino offers credit. Let Yt denote what the gambler's holdings would be if he/she could obtain unlimited credit (so Y can attain negative values).

 Stopping at a deterministic time: suppose that the casino is prepared to lend the gambler unlimited credit, and that the gambler resolves to leave the game at a predetermined time T, regardless of the state of play. Then X is really the stopped process YT, since the gambler's account remains in the same state after leaving the game as it was in at the moment that the gambler left the game.
 Stopping at a random time: suppose that the gambler has no other sources of revenue, and that the casino will not extend its customers credit. The gambler resolves to play until and unless he/she goes broke. Then the random time

is a stopping time for Y, and, since the gambler cannot continue to play after he/she has exhausted his/her resources, X is the stopped process Yτ.

Brownian motion
Let  be a one-dimensional standard Brownian motion starting at zero.

 Stopping at a deterministic time : if , then the stopped Brownian motion  will evolve as per usual up until time , and thereafter will stay constant: i.e.,  for all .
 Stopping at a random time: define a random stopping time  by the first hitting time for the region :

Then the stopped Brownian motion  will evolve as per usual up until the random time , and will thereafter be constant with value : i.e.,  for all .

See also
 Killed process

References
Robert G. Gallager. Stochastic Processes: Theory for Applications. Cambridge University Press, Dec 12, 2013 pg. 450

Stochastic processes